Gabriel Popovic (born 28 July 2003) is an Australian professional footballer who plays as a forward for  Rudeš.

Club career
On 7 August 2019, he made his professional debut against Western Sydney Wanderers in the 2019 FFA Cup.

Personal life
Popovic is the son of former Crystal Palace and Socceroos player Tony Popovic, and the younger brother of Kristian Popovic.

References

External links

2003 births
Living people
People from Westminster
Australian people of Croatian descent
Association football forwards
Australian soccer players
Western Sydney Wanderers FC players
Perth Glory FC players
Xanthi F.C. players
NK Rudeš players
National Premier Leagues players
First Football League (Croatia) players